Baclayon, officially the Municipality of Baclayon,  is a 4th class municipality in the province of Bohol, Philippines. According to the 2020 census, it has a population of 22,461 people.

It is the home town of actor Cesar Montano, and physicist Caesar Saloma.

The town of Baclayon, Bohol celebrates its feast on December 10, to honor the town patron Immaculate Conception.

History

Baclayon was the first municipality to be established in Bohol by the Spaniards and included originally the areas now made up by the municipalities of Alburquerque, Balilihan, Corella, and Sikatuna. Its original name was Bacayan, from the root word bacay, meaning "detour" in reference to the fact that travellers used to make a detour there around a rocky cliff.

In 1595, two Jesuit priests, Juan de Torres and Gabriel Sanchez, arrived in Bohol to convert the local populace to Catholicism. With native help, they built a stone church which is considered one of the oldest stone churches in the Philippines, and marked the beginning of the town. In 1600, Moros raided the fledgling settlement, which prompted the Jesuits to relocate their residencia to Loboc.

In 1717, Baclayon gained status of a parish. In 1742, Tagbilaran was separated from Baclayon, followed by Alburquerque in 1868, Balilihan in 1828, and Corella in 1884.

Geography
Baclayon is directly east of Tagbilaran, the provincial capital. The municipality also has jurisdiction over Pamilacan Island.

Barangays

Baclayon comprises 17 barangays:

Climate

Demographics

Economy

Tourism

Baclayon is known for its historic Catholic church, declared a National Cultural Treasure in 1995 because it is considered the best preserved of its kind in the region. Its first structure was built in 1595, but the current building is from 1724 and is of Spanish Colonial architecture. Nearby are centuries-old stone buildings like the hermita, and elementary school, as well as the historic public marketplace, a Spanish-era building with giant stone columns supporting the roof. In 2013, the church and bell tower were severely damaged by the 2013 Bohol earthquake.

There are 67 or more Spanish colonial ancestral houses in the municipality, many of them along the main road. The houses, in various stages of preservation or neglect, show Spanish-Filipino wooden craftsmanship and styling, some of which were constructed as early as 1853. They are often utilized for cultural shows and tours, festivals and fiestas, as well as some having been turned into inns.

The island of Pamilacan is a tourist destination for dolphin- and whale-watching.

See also
 Churches in Bohol

References

Sources

External links

 [ Philippine Standard Geographic Code]
Municipality of Baclayon

Municipalities of Bohol
1595 establishments in the Spanish Empire
Populated places established in 1595